Stewart Hill (born March 16, 1962) is an American former award-winning linebacker in the Canadian Football League.

After playing college football with the University of Washington, Hill went to Canada and signed with the Edmonton Eskimos.

He would play in Edmonton for seven seasons, and in his first season (1984) he was an all-star and Jackie Parker Trophy winner (western division rookie and CFL runner up.) He was also an all star in 1989 and 1990, and in 1990 he won the Norm Fieldgate Trophy. He moved to the B.C. Lions in 1991 and 1992, where he was a western all star in 1991. He finished his career with the Saskatchewan Roughriders in 1993. His 126 career quarterback sacks is 6th best in CFL history.

Notes

1962 births
Living people
BC Lions players
Edmonton Elks players
Players of American football from Seattle
Players of Canadian football from Seattle
Saskatchewan Roughriders players
Washington Huskies football players
Canadian Football League Rookie of the Year Award winners